The following businesses are or were retailers' cooperatives, which are owned by retail businesses, and provide centralised marketing and buying services.

Grocery stores
 ADM Londis – partially demutualized in 2004
 Affiliated Food Stores
 Affiliated Foods Midwest
 Affiliated Foods Southwest
 Associated Food Stores
 Associated Grocers
 Associated Grocers of Florida
 Associated Grocers of Maine
 Associated Grocers of New England
 Associated Grocers of the South
 Associated Supermarkets
 Associated Wholesale Grocers
 Associated Wholesalers
 Central Grocers Cooperative
 Certified Grocers Midwest
 Co-operative Group (also a consumers' cooperative in its own right)
 Coop Norden
 Conad
 E. Leclerc
 Foodstuffs
 The Fresh Grocer (Wakefern Food Corporation)
 IGA
 Nisa
 Olean Wholesale Grocery
 PriceRite (Wakefern Food Corporation)
 ShopRite (Wakefern Food Corporation)
 Shurfine
 Système U
 Topco
 U.R.M. Stores
 Unified Western Grocers
 Western Family Foods

Pharmacies 
 Family Pharmacy
 Good Neighbor Pharmacy
 Health Mart
 IDL Drug Stores (defunct)
 Leader Drug Stores
 Rexall (no longer a retailer)
 Valu-Rite

Hardware stores 
 Ace Hardware
 Distribution America (Trustworthy Hardware, Sentry Hardware, Golden Rule Lumber Center, Priced Right Everyday) 
 Do It Best
 Handy Hardware
 Home Hardware
 Mica DIY
 Mitre 10
 PRO Hardware
 True Value
 United Hardware Distributing Company (Hardware Hank) 
 Val-Test Distributors

Distributors 
 National Automotive Parts Association
 Val-Test Distributors
 Orgill
 Jensen Distribution Services

Other 
 Best Western – hotel marketing
 The Bike Cooperative – began in 2003 as a subsidiary of the Carpet One parent cooperative (CCA Global Partners); in  2009, it became a bona fide cooperative of independent US bike store owners
 Chez Hotels
 Florists' Transworld Delivery (FTD) and Interflora (US and UK/Ireland affiliates demutualized in 1995 and 2006, respectively)
 Intres b.v.
 KaleidoScoops
 Lighting One
 Mr. Tire (Universal Cooperatives)
 Les Mousquetaires

See also 

 Retailer Owned Food Distributors & Associates – federation of grocers' cooperatives
 Consumers' cooperative
 List of cooperatives
 SPAR – an international grocers' and distributors' marketing and buying association that organizes along similar lines to a co-operative

References

 
Cooperatives
Lists of cooperatives